Trabzonspor Club Women's  Football Team is the women's football team of Trabzonspor in Trabzon, Turkey. It was established on 16 October 2007.

Right after its foundation, the team was invited to join the Turkish Women's Football Super League.  However, the league was cancelled in 2003 but re-established for the 2007–08 season. Trabzonspor were the champions in the 2008–09 season, which was the second year of the league.

History

Foundation 

The first women's football team in Trabzon was of the Karadeniz Teknik Üniversitesi (KTÜ) formed in 2001. Following this initiative, another football club in Trabzon, İdmanocağı founded its women's team basing it on the squad of Trabzon High School. However, due to inadequate interest, women's football in Trabzon did not improve.

In 2007, former KTÜ player Zeliha Şimşek and Trabzonspor's coordinator Özkan Sümer formed the team. Using their previous experiences where they had played a leading role in the foundation of a women's team within Trabzonspor, they formed the team in six weeks before the beginning of the league season. The Trabzonspor women's team competed in the first year of the women's league along with the other women's team in Trabzon, İdmanocağı.

Later years 
The team played its first league match against İdmanocağı on November 18, 2007 at its home stadium Mehmet Ali Yılmaz Stadium and won by 2–0. However, Trabzonspor was not so successful in later matches to get out of Group C. Gazi Üniversitesispor from Ankara, which played in the same group, became champion in the 2007–08 season.
With the 2008–09 season, the structure of the women's league was modified and it gained national status. Trabzonspor competed in the restructured league of ten teams and gained the champion's title with 45 points in 18 games defeating Cengiz Topelspor of Mersin by 2–0 in the last match played away.

With this achievement, Trabzonspor became the only Turkish club which was champion of both the men's and women's premier leagues.

Re-establishment 
The women's football team of the club was re-established after the Turkish Football Federation formed the Turkish Women's Football Super League replacing Turkish Women's First Football League in 2021, and appealed to the major men's football clubs in the Süper Lig to participate in the women's football. The team is one of the eight new formed teams, which joined the  2021–22 Turkish Women's Football Super League for the first time.

Statistics 

(1): Season in progress

International competitions 
Trabzonspor was entitled to participate in the qualifying round of the 2009–10 UEFA Women's Champions League. This was the first time a Turkish women's football team had participated in the qualifying round of the UEFA league since it was established in 2001.

The team won its first match in the Group D against ŽNK Krka from Slovenia by 2–0, however lost the following matches to Italy's Torres Calcio Femminile by 0–9 and to Slovan Duslo Šaľa from Slovakia by 1–2. Trabzonspor women's team failed to participate in the 2009–2010 UEFA Champions League.

Achievements 
 Turkish Women's Football Premier League:
 Winners (1): 2008–09
 Runners-up (1): 2009–10

Current squad 

Head coach:  Mehmet Birinci

Notable former players 

  Nagehan Akşan (2008–2010)
  Aybüke Arslan (2008–2011)
  Çiğdem Belci (2009–2010)
 Rose Bella( 2021–2022)
  Gamze Bezan (2009–2011)
  Eylül Elgalp (2010–2011)
  Fatma Kara (2010–2011)
  Tatiana Matveeva (2008–2011)
  Kristina Shadoba (2008–2011)
  Zeliha Şimşek (2007–2011)
  Setora Takaboeva (2021–2022)
  Khatia Tchkonia (2009–2010)
  Cansu Yağ (2010–2011)
  Kamila Zaripova (2021–2022)

Kit history

References 

Women
Sport in Trabzon
Women's football clubs in Turkey
Association football clubs established in 2007
2007 establishments in Turkey
Association football clubs disestablished in 2011
2011 disestablishments in Turkey
Association football clubs established in 2021
2021 establishments in Turkey